The 5‑ton 6x6 truck, officially "Truck, 5-ton, 4x4", was a class of heavy-duty six-wheel drive trucks used by the US Armed Forces. The basic cargo version was designed to transport a 5-ton (4,500 kg) load over all roads and cross-country terrain in all weather. Through three evolutionary series (M39, M809, and M939) there have been component improvements, but all trucks were mechanically very similar. They were the standard heavy-duty truck of the US military for 40 years, until replaced by the Medium Tactical Vehicle (MTV) beginning in 1991.

History 
A 20 June 1945 report by the Army Ground Forces Equipment Review Board recommended that all 4‑ton to 6‑ton tactical trucks should be replaced by a single standard 5‑ton (4,536 kg) 6x6 truck series. In 1949 specifications were set and truck manufactures began working on prototypes. Chrysler, GMC, and Mack's designs were advanced, International Harvester's was a conservative conventional, similar in size and layout to the earlier 6-ton (G512) series.

The International Harvester design was chosen and rushed into production in January 1951, it would be standardized as the M39 series. Kaiser (renamed Kaiser-Jeep in 1963) also became a major manufacturer, with Diamond T and Mack building smaller numbers. In 1963 Kaiser-Jeep began building the final order, production was completed in 1965.

In the 1960s more trucks were required, and the Army wanted to replace the multifuel engines with a standard diesel. AM General (successor of Kaiser-Jeep) developed an updated and redesigned version of the M39 series. Standardized as the M809 series, the primary difference was the engine. The hood, frame, and fenders were lengthened to make room for the larger engine, and it had a redesigned grille. All had an air cleaner on the left front fender, a quick visual way to tell them from the earlier M39 series. Jeep/AM General built all M809s between 1969 and 1982.

The M939 series was a Product Improvement Package of the M809, with updated engine, transmission, and brakes. A new, larger cab and tilt-forward hood were a major visual change from earlier trucks. Early M939s were rebuilds of M809 vehicles, suffix –A2 are new production by Bowen-McLaughlin-York/BMY with later model Cummins engine.

Engines 
The 5-ton family had five different engines in its life, one gasoline, one multifuel, and three different diesels.

The M39 series had three different engines, all with different operating characteristics. The 1951 design was originally powered by a Continental R6602, a   inline 6 cylinder gasoline engine. These models had no external air filter and had the exhaust outlet under the right side of the truck's body. The engine was a successful design but by 1960 its  and the use of gasoline as a fuel in heavy trucks were becoming a problem.

In 1962-1963 Diamond T and Mack began retrofitting M52 semi-tractors and M54 cargo trucks to the -A1 standard. They had a Mack ENDT-673, a   turbocharged inline 6 cylinder diesel engine. These were the only diesel M39 series models.

The -A2 had the army standard design LDS-465-1 multifuel engine built by Continental. It was a   turbocharged inline 6 cylinder multifuel engine. Using M.A.N. technology it was a diesel type that could also use other fuel oils or a gasoline/oil mix in an emergency. Also used by the M35 -ton series this engine was successful in the smaller trucks but was underpowered compared to all other-5-ton models.

All models of the M809 series used this engine throughout their service life. The N series was a very successful commercial design, with a conservative rating the engine was more powerful and less stressed than the multifuel engine.

The M939 and M939A1 models were rebuilds of the M809 series and used their NHC 250 engine. Although the design is dated it is still powerful and reliable in service and was not significantly up-graded. The M939A2 new production models use a modern Cummins 6CTA8.3   turbocharged and aftercooled inline 6 cylinder diesel engine. This is also a successful commercial design.

Driveline
The M39 and M809 series had a Spicer 5 speed manual synchromesh transmission. The M939 used an Allison automatic, for better engine speed control and driving ease.

A two speed transfer case also engaged the front axle. M39s and M809s used one which engaged the front axle automatically if the rear wheels turned faster than the front, as when the rear wheels spun. The M939s had an improved type, which always engaged the front axle in the low range, in the high range the driver could engage and disengage it with an air control.

Chassis

A ladder frame with three live beam axles, the front on leaf springs, the rear tandem on leaf springs with locating arms. Brakes on the M39 and M809 were air over hydraulic with drum brakes on all wheels, M939s were full air. Many trucks were available with a front-mounted  capacity winch.

There were three wheelbases (Measurements are from the centerline of the front axle to the centerline of rear tandem).

Most models had 11.00x20 size tires with dual rear tires, bridge trucks and some chassis-cabs had 14.00x20 with dual rear tires. Early M939s used 11.00x20s with dual tires, but M939A1s had 14.00x20s with single rear tires and M939A2s introduced a central tire inflation system.

Models

Cargo trucks

Both had removable side racks with fold down troop seats and bows for a tarpaulin. There were no drop side versions, and none had troop seats.

Dump trucks

Dump trucks were used to haul sand, gravel, dirt, rubble, scrap, and other bulk materials. They had a  dump body with cab protector and a tailgate that could hinge at either the top or bottom. They could be equipped with overhead bows, a tarpaulin, and troop seats, but the relatively small size of the body limited their passenger or cargo load.

Medium wrecker trucks 

Medium wrecker trucks were used to recover disabled or stuck trucks and lift large components. Although the truck was not meant to carry a load, the boom could support  when towing.

Tractor trucks 

Tractor trucks normally tow a 12-ton ( load rated 4-wheel (two axles) trailer. There are stake/platform, van, tank, and low-bed models. There is also a 15-ton low bed trailer, the heaviest possible off-road. A 25-ton low-bed trailer can be towed on prepared surfaces.

Unlike commercial trucks the fifth-wheel can also pivot side to side, making a more flexible connection to the trailer. Even so, off-road performance is limited
to relatively flat and solid ground.

Medium wrecker tractor trucks

Medium wrecker tractor trucks, with an extra long wheelbase, were a wrecker with a fifth wheel mounted behind the boom. Meant for aircraft recovery, the truck could perform wrecker duties and load and tow semi trailers.

Expansible van trucks

Some had hydraulic lift-gates.

Bridge transporting trucks

In the M939 series there were no standardized bridge models, instead specialized bodies were mounted on chassis-cabs.

Logging bolster trucks

Logging bolster trucks, with a bolster trailer, were used to carry long loads like logs, poles, and bridge sections. When unloaded the trailer could be loaded onto the truck. There were no bolster trucks in the M939 series.

Chassis cabs 
Chassis cabs were produced in different wheelbases for specialty bodies. The largest, the M39 series M139C/D, was an Honest John rocket launcher.

Model numbers

Gallery

Notes

References 
 
 
 
 
 
 
 
 
 
 
 
 
    and

External links
 M39 series at Olive-Drab.com
 M54 series Technical Manuals at Jatonka
 M809 series at Olive-Drab
 M809 series at Military-Today
  M809 series at Global Security.org
  M809 series Technical Manuals at  Jatonka
  M809 series Technical Manuals at NSN Lookup
  M939 series at Olive-Drab
  M939 series at Global Security.org
M939 series Technical Manuals at Jatonka
 M939 series Technical Manuals at NSN Lookup

Military trucks of the United States